Northern Electric Railway may refer to:

 Northern Electric Railway (California), a predecessor of the Sacramento Northern Railway, an interurban in northern California
 Scranton, Montrose and Binghamton Railroad, an interurban in northeastern Pennsylvania